Juan Manuel San Martín Da Costa (born 20 January 1994) is a Uruguayan professional footballer who plays as a forward for Portuguese club Real SC.

Club career
Born in Rivera, San Martín is a product of Peñarol youth system, joining them in 2009, at age 15. Two years later, reports in the press informed that he, Jim Varela and Elbio Álvarez were joining S.L. Benfica but the deal was only finalised in 2012. The transfer fee was a reported for €2.9 million by some sources, and €2.4 million by others.

In 2013, he was loaned to Farense, playing 11 league matches, without scoring. He returned to Benfica the following season, being loaned to Central Español in September 2014. In this team, he appeared in 8 games and scored 3 goals. At the end of the loan, he returned to Benfica B.

International career
San Martín was part of the squad of the Uruguay U-17 that took part in the 2011 South American U17 in Ecuador and in the 2011 FIFA U-17 World Cup, playing five matches and scoring once.

References

External links
 
 

1994 births
Living people
People from Rivera Department
Uruguayan footballers
Association football forwards
Liga Portugal 2 players
Campeonato de Portugal (league) players
Uruguayan Segunda División players
S.L. Benfica B players
S.C. Farense players
Central Español players
Louletano D.C. players
Manta F.C. footballers
Real S.C. players
Uruguayan expatriate footballers
Expatriate footballers in Portugal
Uruguayan expatriate sportspeople in Portugal
Expatriate footballers in Ecuador
Uruguayan expatriate sportspeople in Ecuador
Uruguay under-20 international footballers
Uruguay youth international footballers